Paul O. Jaeger was a member of the Wisconsin State Assembly.

Biography
Jaeger was born on June 20, 1891, in Milwaukee, Wisconsin. He would become a mail clerk, cost clerk, construction foreman and real estate broker.

Political career
Jaeger was a member of the Assembly during the 1947 session. He was a Republican.

References

Politicians from Milwaukee
Republican Party members of the Wisconsin State Assembly
American real estate brokers
1891 births
Year of death missing